USFF may refer to
 Ultra small form factor
 United States Fleet Forces Command
 United States Futsal Federation